Bruno Cavalcanti de Araújo (born 15 March 1972 in Recife) is a Brazilian lawyer and politician, filiated to the Brazilian Social Democracy Party (PSDB). Was discharged  from his third term as federal deputy for the state of Pernambuco to assume the Ministry of Cities, appointed by the then acting president Michel Temer.

On 17 April 2016, at 11:07pm (Brasília time zone), Araújo gave the vote 342 that authorized the admissibility of the process of impeachment of president Dilma Rousseff.

He is mentioned in 2017 among the beneficiaries of bribes from the multinational JBS.

Resigned from the office of Minister on 13 November 2017 during a conflict between part of the Brazilian Social Democracy Party and the government.

Araújo was elect National President of the PSDB on 31 May 2019, replacing former Governor of São Paulo, Geraldo Alckmin.

References

External links

|-

1972 births
Brazilian Social Democracy Party politicians
Living people
Politicians from Recife
Government ministers of Brazil
21st-century Brazilian lawyers
Members of the Chamber of Deputies (Brazil) from Pernambuco